The discography of God Is an Astronaut, an Irish post-rock band from Wicklow, consists of eight studio albums, one extended play, and eleven singles.

Studio albums

Extended plays

Singles

Retail singles

Split singles

Music videos

Miscellaneous appearances

References
General references

Specific references

External links

Discographies of Irish artists
Rock music discographies
Electronic music discographies